Depati Amir Airport  also known as Pangkal Pinang Airport, is an airport in Indonesia located in Pangkal Pinang on Bangka Island, part of Bangka Belitung Islands province. The airport has been managed by PT. Angkasa Pura II since January 2007. It was originally named Pangkalpinang Airport built since the Japanese occupation of 1942 as a defense against Allied soldiers. In accordance with the letter of the Secretary General of the Ministry of Transportation. 378 / TLK / DEPHUB / VIII / 85 dated 22 August 1985 the name of the airport was changed to airport. Based on the Decree of the Minister of Transportation No. SK.1 / AU.106 / PHB-99 dated 25 August 1999, Pangkalpinang Airport was changed to Amir Bangka Airport, which is an UPT from Vertical Institution of Directorate General of Civil Aviation, Ministry of Transportation.

Since January 1, 2007, the airport was handed over to a state-owned company in charge of the management of several airports in western Indonesia, namely PT. Angkasa Pura II (Persero).
For air space controlled by the Air Traffic Service Unit of Depati Amir Airport initially only serves the area around the airport up to 2500 feet altitude. In 1992, the border area expanded, with a horizontal limit of up to 30 Nm, and a vertical limit of 15,000 feet. In 2008 after being managed by PT. Angkasa Pura II, horizontal boundaries widened to a distance of varied 80 Nm, while the vertical limit to 24,500 feet.
Since January 1, 2013 airspace management at Depati Amir Airport has been transferred to the Indonesian Air Navigation Service Provider or AirAsia Operator. It is one of the two main airport in Bangka Belitung province, the other being H.A.S. Hanandjoeddin International Airport in Belitung. The airport is awarded as the best airport in Asia-Pacific in 2020 (under 2 million passenger per annum) by Airports Council International

Future planning

In 1978, the foundation was moved to the west for about 75 meters, with a length of 1200m. Then gradually continue to be extended 1600 m, 1800m, 2000m and now, the runway reached the length of 2600m x 45m. This airport runway has been able to land aircraft type Boeing 737-800NG / 900ER, & Airbus A320, although in a limited capacity.
The aircraft parking lot (apron) has also been overlaid several times (asphalt thickening). The airport apron has been able to accommodate 4 narrow-body aircraft at once, such as Boeing 737-800NG / 900ER, & Airbus A320.

Terminal

After multiple delays, a new airport terminal finally started operation on 11 January 2017. With an investment of about 300 billion rupiah, the construction of the terminal is able to increase the passenger capacity of 350 thousand passengers per year to more than 1.5 million passengers per year. The new terminal building stands on an area of 12 thousand square meters of total land area of about 152 hectares. Nevertheless, it currently only serves domestic flights.

Revitalization is done on the airport's landside which includes construction of a new terminal, improvement of terminal facilities, construction of a new apron, as well as construction of a larger and more spacious car parking area. Besides being larger, the new terminal also has a modern design and is equipped with additional amenities such as food courts, executive break room, internet facilities, disabled toilets, as well as a room mother and child. Other facilities include 12 check-in counters, 3 departure gates, and 2 jetbridges. The new parking facilities are now capable of accommodating 300 cars and 120 motorcycles.

Airlines and destinations

Passenger

References

External links

 

Airports in Sumatra
Buildings and structures in the Bangka Belitung Islands